Finn Hågen Krogh, born 6 September 1990) is a Norwegian cross-country skier who has competed at FIS Cross-Country World Cup since 2011.

Career
Krogh was born in Alta. He is of Sami and Norwegian descent.

Krogh represents Tverrelvdalen IL. In addition to being a cross-country skier, he played for Tverrelvdalen's senior football team in the 3. divisjon before he had to choose between football and skiing. As Krogh was selected for youth national team in cross-country skiing, he chose to quit football, but said in an interview with Norwegian TV 2 in 2011 that he believes he could have been a professional Tippeligaen player if he had chosen football ahead of skiing. In the same interview he stated that he thinks it is more fun to play football than to compete in cross-country skiing.

2009–2013
Krogh participated in the 2009 Junior World Ski Championships in Praz de Lys-Sommand, Haute-Savoie where he won bronze in the 4x5 km relay. The next year, Krogh won the relay race in the junior world championship in Hinterzarten, along with Tomas Northug, Didrik Tønseth and Pål Golberg. Krogh also won a bronze in the 20 km skiathlon, and finished fourth at 5 km classic. Krogh won gold in 10 km freestyle in the Norwegian youth championship in 2010.

He made his break-through in the World Cup when he finished second behind Petter Northug in the race in Falun on 20 March 2011. He won his first World Cup relay with Eldar Rønning, Lars Berger and Petter Northug on 20 November 2011 at Sjusjøen.

2013–2014
On 1 January 2013 he won the third stage of the 2012–13 Tour de Ski, which was a sprint. In the Norwegian skiing championship in 2013 at Gåsbu in Hamar, he was number two on the 15 free with individual start, 5.1 seconds behind Martin Johnsrud Sundby.

On 28 January 2014, after the Norwegian championship at Lillehammer, the national team coach Arild Monsen stated that Krogh would go the individual sprint in the 2014 Winter Olympics on 11 February 2013 along with Eirik Brandsdal and Anders Gløersen, while the fourth spot was to be decided after the sprint in Toblach. While Petter Northug was one of the favourites to win the Olympic sprint, Ola Vigen Hattestad won the sprint in Toblach, and on 5 February 2014 the national team decided to select both Hattestad and Northug to compete in the sprint at the expense of Krogh.

2014–2015
Krogh won the World Cup title in the sprint discipline. He also won the team freestyle sprint at the FIS World Championships in Falun, with Petter Northug.

2015–2016
Krogh placed second overall in the Tour de Ski.

2020–2021
After the 2020–21 season, it was announced that Krogh had been dropped from the Norwegian National Cross-country Team.

Cross-country skiing results
All results are sourced from the International Ski Federation (FIS).

Olympic Games

World Championships
 3 medals – (2 gold, 1 bronze)

Season titles
 1 title – (1 sprint)

Season standings

Individual podiums
 8 victories – (4 , 4 ) 
 28 podiums – (17 , 11 )

Team podiums
 6 victories – (6 ) 
 8 podiums – (8 )

References

External links
 
 
 
 

1990 births
Living people
People from Alta, Norway
Norwegian male cross-country skiers
Norwegian Sámi people
FIS Nordic World Ski Championships medalists in cross-country skiing
Tour de Ski skiers
Cross-country skiers at the 2018 Winter Olympics
Olympic cross-country skiers of Norway
Sportspeople from Troms og Finnmark